Quercus is a 2013 live album by English folksinger June Tabor, Welsh jazz pianist Huw Warren & English saxophonist Iain Ballamy. It is also the name of the trio project which derived from an earlier collaboration on Tabor's At the Wood's Heart from 2005. Though, Warren has been a pianist and musical director for Tabor since 1988. The recording took place at The Anvil in Basingstoke at the end of a tour in March 2006. Ballamy, who has previously recorded for ECM Records with his experimental jazz duo Food, recalled “the piano was excellent, the acoustics in the hall were good, and nobody coughed.”

Material
Many of the pieces dig deep into the British folk music and are well known traditionals. Furthermore, they fall back to works of William Shakespeare or Robert Burns and George Butterworth and set them into new arrangements for this trio. "This Is Always" by Mack Gordon and Harry Warren remains the only jazz standard while one contemporary song by film composer David Ballantine entered the track list. Additionally the pop songs "Who Wants the Evening Rose" by Les Barker/Yosef Hadar and "All I Ask of You" by American monk Gregory Norbet (an adaption Ballamy previously created with colleague Django Bates for their Loose Tubes) were queued. The timeline concludes with a solo composition by Warren which is inspired by Renaissance composer John Dowland.

Track listing

Personnel

Music
 June Tabor - vocals
 Huw Warren - piano
 Iain Ballamy - soprano & tenor saxophone

Production
 Manfred Eicher - producing, mixing
 Jan Erik Kongshaug - mixing
 Paul Sparrow - engineering
 Mike Mower - editing
 Jan Kricke - photography
 Sascha Kleis - design

Reception

The album has been widely praised by international media while especially Tabor's participation and their interplay gathered profound recognition. The Times has prescinded that "the fusion is magical here as the pair’s subtle embellishments accentuate the force of Tabor’s austere yet soulful delivery on tunes that range from ancient folk to their own." John Kelman at AllAboutJazz points out the interaction saying that "Tabor [is] acting as the focal point around which her partners' improvisational forays ultimately rally". The Observer critic Dave Gelly admitted that "this is one of the most surprising and beautiful pieces of work I have heard in a long time." While John Fordham wrote in The Guardian that "Nobody plays a note too many or expresses a false emotion. It's a unique tribute to the power of song." It peaked the Billboard Jazz Album charts at #34 in 2013. Even the Rolling Stone has called it "One of the year’s very best." Furthermore, it was "Album of the Week" in JazzWeekly and German newspaper Frankfurter Allgemeine Zeitung.

References

External links
 Official album entry at ecmrecords.com
 Official ECM player for Quercus with a full audio track
 Album entry at discogs.com

June Tabor albums
2013 albums